Farida Massaoud al-Abani (born 16 September 1988) is a Swedish politician and the party co-leader of Feminist Initiative. She has previously acted as the party's spokesperson on social issues and migration policy.

Born in Tajura, Libya, al-Abani moved with her family to Sweden at the age of three. She has a degree in public health and is active within the temperance movement. She was awarded the title Årets eldsjäl by IOGT-NTO in 2017. al-Abani has previously served on the board of the women's organization Streetgäris.

In February 2019, al-Abani succeeded Gudrun Schyman as one of two party leaders of Feminist Initiative. She served alongside Gita Nabavi, incumbent since 2018, until Nabavi resigned on 8 March 2020. al-Abani has remained as the sole leader of the party since then.

References 

1988 births
Living people
Swedish temperance activists
Feminist Initiative (Sweden) politicians
Leaders of political parties in Sweden